The 1992 Full Members' Cup final, also known by its sponsored name, the Zenith Data Systems Cup, was a football match which took place at Wembley Stadium on 29 March 1992. It was contested between Nottingham Forest and Southampton. The match was shown live on Sky Sports.

Match details

Summary
Scot Gemmill opened the scoring for Nottingham Forest in the 15th minute with a right foot volley from the right of the penalty area. Kingsley Black got the second with a low left footed shot into the corner of the net. Southampton got one back in the 64th minute with Matt Le Tissier header from six yards out after a cross from the left. Southampton equalised six minutes later when Kevin Moore headed in from six yards after a corner from the right. The match went to extra time and Scot Gemmill got the winning goal and his second with five minutes remaining when he volleyed in from six yards after a cross from the right. Des Walker collected the trophy, having taken over as captain when Stuart Pearce was substituted with an injury in the first half.

Teams

 || ||

 
 

 

 || ||

References

1992
1991–92 in English football
Full Members' Cup 1992
Full Members' Cup 1992
March 1992 sports events in the United Kingdom
1992 sports events in London